The United States federal government defines and delineates the nation's metropolitan areas for statistical purposes, using a set of standard statistical area definitions.  the U.S. Office of Management and Budget (OMB) defined and delineated 392 metropolitan statistical areas (MSAs) and 547 micropolitan statistical areas (μSAs) in the United States and Puerto Rico. Many of these 939 MSAs and μSAs are, in turn, components of larger combined statistical areas (CSAs) consisting of adjacent MSAs and μSAs that are linked by commuting ties;  551 metropolitan and micropolitan areas are components of the 175 defined CSAs.  A collective term for MSAs, μSAs, and CSAs is primary statistical areas (PSAs), though that term is not used by OMB.

Metropolitan and micropolitan statistical areas are defined as consisting of one or more adjacent counties or county equivalents with at least one urban core area meeting relevant population thresholds, plus adjacent territory that has a high degree of social and economic integration with the core, as measured by commuting ties. A metropolitan statistical area has at least one urban core with a population of at least 50,000. In a micropolitan statistical area, the largest urban core has a population of at least 10,000 but less than 50,000.

Maps

Types and distribution
The sortable table below shows the number of metropolitan and micropolitan statistical areas in each of the U.S. states, the District of Columbia, and Puerto Rico. For each jurisdiction, it lists:
Total number of delineated areas wholly or partially in the named jurisdiction
The number of CSAs wholly or partially in the jurisdiction
The number of core-based statistical areas (i.e., MSAs and µSAs) wholly or partially in the jurisdiction
The number of MSAs wholly or partially in the jurisdiction
The number of µSAs wholly or partially in the jurisdiction
The number of counties and county-equivalents in the jurisdiction
Please note:  Because many metropolitan and micropolitan areas overlap jurisdictional boundaries, columns are not additive.

List of primary statistical areas
The following sortable table lists the 569 primary statistical areas (PSAs) of the United States with the following information:
The PSA rank by population as of July 1, 2020
The PSA name as designated by the United States Office of Management and Budget
The PSA population as of July 1, 2020, as estimated by the United States Census Bureau
The PSA population as of April 1, 2010, as enumerated by the 2010 United States census
The percent PSA population change from April 1, 2010, to July 1, 2020
If the PSA is a combined statistical area, the constituent core-based statistical areas

Puerto Rico
The following sortable table lists the five primary statistical areas (PSAs) of Puerto Rico with the following information:
The PSA rank by population as of July 1, 2020, as estimated by the United States Census Bureau
The PSA name as designated by the United States Office of Management and Budget
The PSA population as of July 1, 2020, as estimated by the United States Census Bureau
The PSA population as of April 1, 2010, as enumerated by the 2010 United States census
The percent PSA population change from April 1, 2010, to July 1, 2020
If the PSA is a combined statistical area, the constituent core-based statistical areas

See also

United States of America
Outline of the United States
Index of United States-related articles

Demographics of the United States
United States Census Bureau
List of U.S. states and territories by population
List of metropolitan areas of the United States
List of United States cities by population
List of U.S. cities by adjusted per capita personal income
List of United States counties and county-equivalents

United States Office of Management and Budget
Statistical area (United States)
Combined statistical area (list)
Core-based statistical area (list)
Metropolitan statistical area (list)
Micropolitan statistical area (list)

References

External links

United States Government
United States Census Bureau
2010 United States Census
USCB population estimates
United States Office of Management and Budget

 
Statistical Area Of The United States